Roland de Corneille (May 19, 1927 – December 30, 2014) was a Canadian Anglican priest, human rights activist and politician. He represented the riding of Eglinton-Lawrence in the House of Commons of Canada as a member of the Liberal Party from 1979 to 1988.

Background
Born in Switzerland, de Corneille spent his childhood in France and moved to the United States where he worked and received much of his formal education. He received his BA cum laude from Amherst College, where he was elected to Phi Beta Kappa honorary society. He worked for Time Inc. as a statistician, and with Procter and Gamble. He studied at General Theological Seminary in New York and then transferred to Canada and graduated from the University of Toronto's Trinity College in 1953 as an ordained Anglican priest. He served as a curate and as a rector of a number of Anglican parish churches, while earning his degrees of Licentiate of Theology, Bachelor of Sacred Theology and Master of Theology in studies at McGill, Yale and Trinity College, Toronto. He died on December 30, 2014, aged 87.

Views on Judaism
In 1960, de Corneille was the secretary of the Nathaneal Institute, an Anglican missionary institute dedicated to converting Jews to Christianity. De Corneille initiated an interfaith dialogue between the Christian and Jewish communities that led to the institute transforming itself into "the Christian-Jewish Dialogue of the Anglican Church of Canada" with de Corneille as director. The Dialogue sought better understanding between the two faith groups rather than religious conversion. In 1966, his book, Christians and Jews: The Tragic Past and the Hopeful Future was published by Harper and Row.

De Corneille is credited as the first Canadian clergyman to urge the Christian community to re-evaluate its attitude towards Jews.

As a result of de Corneille's efforts, the Anglican Church re-evaluated its attitude towards the Jewish community and renounced proselytization in favour of understanding, dialogue and reconciliation.

The process was continued by de Corneille by introducing the programme into other Canadian denominations, the Episcopal Church U.S.A., and through his membership in the World Council of Churches in Geneva. He worked with the National Conference of Christians and Jews U.S.A.. and the Canadian Conference of Christians and Jews as organizer of a major International Conference on Christian-Jewish relations. The Christian-Jewish dialogue program initiated by de Corneille ultimately spread to the United States and Europe and helped lead to a change of attitude within mainstream Christian churches, particularly towards anti-Semitism

De Corneille's activity earned him the respect of the Jewish community. In 1971 he was appointed national director of the League for Human Rights of B'nai Brith Canada where he worked until 1979. In the 1979 federal election he was elected to the House of Commons of Canada as the Liberal Member of Parliament for Eglinton—Lawrence, serving in the House until 1988.

Political career
In parliament, he was the founding chairman of the Canada-Israel Parliamentary Friendship Group, and a chairman of the Canada-Italy Parliamentary Friendship Group. From 1980 to 1981 he was national chairman of the National Committee for a Human Rights Charter which lobbied parliament for the creation of the Canadian Charter of Rights and Freedoms.

He served for three terms in the House of Commons until he was challenged for the Liberal nomination by Joe Volpe and defeated in a bitter nomination meeting prior to the 1988 federal election.

Electoral record

Works
De Corneille, Roland. Christians and Jews: The Tragic Past and the Hopeful Future.  New York: Harper & Row, 1966.

References

Rev. Roland de Corneille Papers, Library and Archives Canada

External links
 

1927 births
2014 deaths
Amherst College alumni
Canadian Anglican priests
Christian and Jewish interfaith dialogue
Liberal Party of Canada MPs
Members of the House of Commons of Canada from Ontario
Swiss emigrants to Canada
Trinity College (Canada) alumni
University of Toronto alumni